The 1950 Ball State Cardinals football team was an American football team that represented Ball State Teachers College (later renamed Ball State University) as an independent during the 1950 college football season. In its 15th season under head coach John Magnabosco, the team compiled a 2–4–1 record. The 1950 season followed a 1949 season in which the Cardinals had compiled a perfect 8–0 record.

Key players on the 1950 Ball State team included quarterback Bob Baker and halfbacks Don McAfee and Dick Isenberg. 

During the 1950 season, Ball State began discussions that led to its joining the new Indiana Collegiate Conference for the 1951 season.

The team played its home games at Ball State Field in Muncie, Indiana.

Schedule

References

Ball State
Ball State Cardinals football seasons
Ball State Cardinals football